Red River Jamboree was a Canadian country music television series which aired on CBC Television from 1960 to 1965.

Premise
This Winnipeg-produced series was initially broadcast as a local production. In June 1965, it was carried nationally on CBC to fill in the time slot between seasons of Country Hoedown.

Episodes were dedicated to a particular western theme such as fur trading, homesteading, how Saturday nights are observed, and the demise of buffalo herds. Music was combined with stories and segments such as film of a historic ranch.

Stu Davis initially hosted Red River Jamboree during the first national broadcasts. Country musician Stu Phillips became host in October 1960 when the series was renewed for its first complete season. Reg Gibson hosted the final episodes of the series after Phillips left for an American-syndicated series, Country A Go Go. Featured artists included the Selkirk Settlers band, the Altones quartet, and dance troupe Valley Beaux and Belles.

Scheduling
This half-hour series was broadcast throughout the CBC network from 1960 to 1965 as follows:

References

External links
 

CBC Television original programming
1960 Canadian television series debuts
1965 Canadian television series endings